Eremias buechneri, also known commonly as the Kaschar racerunner, is a species of lizard in the family Lacertidae. The species is endemic to China.

Etymology
The specific name, buechneri, is in honor of German-Russian zoologist Eugen Büchner.

Geographic range
Within China, E. buechneri is found in Qinghai Province and Xinjiang Autonomous Region, both of which are in northwestern China.

Habitat

Reproduction
E. buechneri is viviparous.

References

Further reading
Bedriaga J (1907). "Verzeichnis der von der Central-Asiatischen Expedition unter Stabs-Kapitän W. Roborowski in den Jahren 1893–1895 gesammelten Reptilien". Annuaire Musée Zoologique de l'Académie Impériale des Sciences de Saint-Pétersbourg 10 (3/4): 159–200. (Eremias buechneri, new species, p. 184). (in French).

Eremias
Reptiles described in 1907
Reptiles of China
Taxa named by Jacques von Bedriaga